WOB may refer to:

 Wob, an online bookseller - formerly known as World of Books
Wolfsburg (German vehicle license plate code)
 Woburn Sands railway station (National Rail code)
 Anderson Regional Transportation Center (Amtrak station code)
 White On Black, a colour scheme used frequently in tabloid newspaper headlines (see Light-on-dark color scheme)
 Way Off Broadway Dinner Theatre
 Weight on bit, the amount of downward force exerted on the drill bit
 Work of breathing, medical term for the effort to move air through the lungs
 World of Beer, a chain of restaurants in the United States